The Queensland Ballet, founded in 1960 by Charles Lisner OBE, is the premier ballet company of Queensland, Australia and is based in Brisbane. Queensland Ballet is one of only three full-time, professional classical ballet companies in Australia.

Performances 
With 60 dancers, Queensland Ballet is a company which presents a varied repertoire of dance works. In addition to performing in Brisbane, the company tours each year to centres in regional Queensland, as well as making interstate and overseas visits.

Under the artistic direction of French-born François Klaus, since 1998, the company has presented approximately 100 performances each year. Its repertoire ranged from popular classics and full-length story ballets to new works in a variety of dance styles by reputed Australian and international choreographers, as well as emerging local talents. Works such as The Little Mermaid, which are designed especially to appeal to children and families, are another feature of the annual program.

The company’s home is the historic Thomas Dixon Centre for Dance in Brisbane's West End. Celebrating its centenary in 2008, the building was first built as a shoe factory in 1908. It now contains four large dance studios, one of which, the Charles Lisner Studio, can be adapted as a performance venue. These facilities enable the company to offer a full range of training and community access programs.

Until the end of 2012 (when Francois Klaus and Robyn (White) Klaus left the Company), Queensland Ballet offered ballet students from as young as 11 years training in the Junior Extension and Professional Year Programs, as well as in the Queensland Dance School of Excellence (a program offered in partnership with Education Queensland).

History 
Lisner trained with Edouard Borovansky and danced with the Borovansky Australian Ballet prior to travelling to London to continue his dance studies and education with the Sadlers Wells Ballet School. He later joined the Royal Ballet, Covent Garden. In 1953, Lisner returned to Australia to open the Lisner Ballet Academy, and in 1960, the Lisner Ballet Company.

The company was renamed Queensland Ballet in 1962 and became the first ballet ensemble in Australia to tour to regional centres throughout Australia. In 1974, Charles Lisner resigned as artistic director and chief executive officer of Queensland Ballet, to be succeeded by Harry Haythorne. Following Haythorne's departure in 1978, founding company member and principal dancer, Harold Collins, was appointed artistic director. Collins led the company until his retirement in 1997, maintaining Lisner's commitment to the creation of uniquely Australian dance, and to forging a strong, independent, original, and visually intriguing company.

Collins was succeeded in 1998 by François Klaus, a respected and experienced European dancer, teacher, and choreographer. Under Klaus's artistic stewardship, Queensland Ballet continued to expand, retaining and remaining a significant force in the Australian cultural landscape. In 1981, Roma Egan retired from the Australian Ballet, in order to take up the position as assistant artistic director for the Queensland Ballet. In July 2012, renowned Chinese dancer Li Cunxin was named as artistic director of the Queensland Ballet.

Dancers 

Dancers of the Queensland Ballet, as of 2021:

Principal Artists

Senior Soloists 

 Mia Heathcote
 Patricio Revé
 Kohei Iwamoto
 Alexander Idaszak

Soloists 

 Vito Bernasconi
 Lina Kim
 Georgia Swan

Character Artists 

 Paul Boyd
 Christian Tátchev
 Greg Horsman
 Mary Li
 Janette Mulligan
 Zenia Tátcheva
 Rachael Walsh

First Company Artists 

 Serena Green 
 Vanessa Morelli
 Sophie Zoricic
 Joseph Chapman 
 Zhi Fang
 Liam Geck 
 David Power
 Rian Thompson

Company Artists 

 Lucy Christodoulou 
 Talia Fidra
 Renee Freeman
 Chiara Gonzaelz 
 Alyssa Kelty 
 Eriko Nakajima 
 Libby-Rose Niederer 
 Brooke Ray 
 Paige Rochester 
 Lou Spichtig 
 Isabella Swietlicki 
 Hayley Thompson
 Laura Tosar 
 D'Arcy Brazier
 Mali Comlekci 
 Shaun Curtis 
 Oscar Delbao
 Luke Dimattina 
 Clayton Forsyth 
 Daniel Kempson
 Dylan Lackey 
 John Paul Lowe 
 Samuel Packer
 Edward Pope
 Charlie Slater 
 Ari Thompson

Jette Parker Young Artists 

 Heidi Freeman
 Ines Hargreaves 
 Bronte Kielly-Coleman 
 Briana McAllen 
 Yuka Nojo
 Kaya Van Den Bogert 
 Kieren Bofinger 
 Lewis Formby 
 Callum Mackie 
 Lachlan Mair 
 Isaac McLean
 Louis Ramsay

References

External links 
 

Culture of Brisbane
Ballet companies in Australia
1960 establishments in Australia
Performing groups established in 1960
Companies based in Brisbane